Kizhakku Mugam is a 1996 Indian  Tamil-language film, directed by M. Anna Thurai, starring Karthik and newcomer Reshma. It was released on 15 January 1996 alongside Karthik's another film Ullathai Allitha.

Plot

Venu and his friend Mukka work at the graveyard. Venu has a mother and a sister called Sindhamani, a studious student. Poongodi, daughter of the village president, eve-teases Sindhamani. Venu orders to Poongodi to stop it immediately and Poongodi decides to revenge Venu. They have some quarrels. Nagaraj, Poongodi's uncle and a smuggler, wants to marry his niece Poongodi. After Poongodi's puberty ceremony, she changes her behaviour and shows sympathy for Venu.

The village president doesn't seem to care about caste or money, so he united many lovers. One day, Nagaraj steals the god status at the temple but Venu beats up the henchmen and he brings back the status. The village's Brahmins criticized his action and to prove the opposite, he recites Sanskrit very well. The village priest proposes to marry his daughter but Venu declares that Poongodi and he are in love. Poongodi's father supplies Poongodi to forget him and Poongodi's father arranges to find a groom but Kannapan, a bad turns good after Venu's advises, helps Venu by menacing the grooms. All the village supports Venu and they don't understand Poongodi's father hypocritical decision.

The village priest asks the Venu's past and his mother discloses that he is not her real son. Venu was the son of a widow Brahmin and he was a gifted boy appreciated by the village priest. Venu's real mother worked in her relative's house and her chief decided to rape her, the chief's wife surprised them and humiliated Venu's real mother in front of the villagers. Venu's real mother and the chief committed suicide. Venu leaves his village with his mother dead-body and he was adopted by a poor family. Poongodi's father accepts his caste, he requests him to separate from his poor family, Venu refuses here and now.

Later, Nagaraj kidnaps Sindhamani and tries to rape her, though to save her virginity, she commits suicide. Venu fights against Nagaraj's henchmen and kills Nagaraj. Feeling guilty of Sindhamani's death, Poongodi's father accepts Venu to marry his daughter.

Cast

Karthik as Venu ('Vettiyan' Venugopal)
Reshma as Poongodi
Radha Ravi as the village president and Poongodi's father
Anandaraj as Nagaraj
Charle as Mukka
Delhi Ganesh as a gurukkal
Alex as Kannapan
Vadivukkarasi as Venu's mother
T. S. Raghavendra as the chief
Sathyapriya as Poongodi's mother
Kumarimuthu as a villager
Shanthi Williams
Manager Cheena

Soundtrack 

The film score and the soundtrack were composed by Adithyan. The soundtrack, released in 1996, features 8 tracks with lyrics written by Vairamuthu.

Release
The film was released simultaneously alongside Karthik's other film Ullathai Allitha on 15 January 1996.

References

1996 films
1990s Tamil-language films
Indian action drama films
1990s action drama films